Zamalek Sporting Club Centennial was the 100 anniversary of the founding of Zamalek Sporting Club. The celebration included sporting, social and artistic events, though the main event was the friendly match against Atlético Madrid; it was delayed for more than once because of the consequences of the Egyptian revolution.

Match details

References

External links 
 http://www.angelfire.com/ak/EgyptianSports/ZamalekFriendlies.html#Zamalek%20100
 http://www.filgoal.com/Arabic/ChampMain.aspx?ChampID=317
 http://www.kooora.com/default.aspx?region=-12&team=132&team2=62
 http://www.kooora.com/default.aspx?n=137442&obj=1000062

Zamalek SC matches
Atlético Madrid matches
Football